Birger Lindberg Pedersen, known as Birger Pedersen, (born 29 June 1950) is a Danish former association footballer in the midfielder position, who played 183 games and scored 41 goals for Danish club Hvidovre IF. He played 14 matches for the Denmark national football team, and scored a goal in the 1971 play-off game against Romania helping Denmark qualify for the 1972 Summer Olympics. He was named 1971 Danish Football Player of the Year. Pedersen signed a professional contract with KV Mechelen in Belgium in 1972, and was not eligible for the Olympics final tournament. He also played for Helsingborgs IF in Sweden before ending his career with Danish club Lyngby BK in 1981, due to injuries.

References

External links
Danish national team profile

1950 births
Living people
Danish men's footballers
Denmark international footballers
Denmark under-21 international footballers
K.V. Mechelen players
Helsingborgs IF players
Lyngby Boldklub players
People from Vordingborg Municipality
Association football midfielders
Sportspeople from Region Zealand